Busy Bakers is a 1940 Warner Bros. Merrie Melodies cartoon directed by Ben Hardaway and Cal Dalton. The short was released on February 10, 1940.

Plot
The local town baker faces going out of business, so an old man decides to help him stay in business after a kind deed offered to him by the baker. He then decides to go into business with the old man.

Home media
 LaserDisc - The Golden Age of Looney Tunes, Volume 4, Side 8
 DVD - Brother Orchid (USA 1995 Turner print added as a bonus)

Notes
 This short is notable for being the final cartoon to be directed by Hardaway and Dalton, due to Friz Freleng returning to Warner Bros. animation studios from Metro-Goldwyn-Mayer's animation studio in 1939, following the failure of their Captain and the Kids series. As a result, Hardaway was demoted back to storyman. He left after being demoted and joined Walter Lantz at Universal Studios, where he helped create Woody Woodpecker. Cal Dalton worked as an animator until 1947 after demotion when Freleng returned.
 This cartoon was re-released into the Blue Ribbon Merrie Melodies program on October 20, 1945.

References

1940 films
1940 animated films
Films scored by Carl Stalling
Films directed by Ben Hardaway
Films directed by Cal Dalton
Merrie Melodies short films
Warner Bros. Cartoons animated short films
1940s Warner Bros. animated short films
1940s English-language films